Smoke 'Em If You Got 'Em is the first album by the Dallas, Texas based rockabilly/psychobilly trio known as the Reverend Horton Heat. It was released in 1990 on the label Sub Pop. An early version of the album had been recorded in the traditional manner (instruments and vocals recorded separately, then mixed in the studio). However, the band and the label decided that it did not fit with their vision, so it was re-recorded "live in the studio" direct to two-track, with the exception of "Love Whip."

The phrase "Smoke 'em if You Got 'em" or "Smoke if You Got 'em" predates this album and is slang for "do what you want, if you have the means." The first phrase was popular during World War II, meaning to take a break. Officers would say "Smoke 'em if you got 'em" allowing the soldiers to take a break and smoke their cigarettes.  [Vic Morrow - Combat! ABC television series October 1962]

It is occasionally used by live performers as part of a repartee bidding goodnight to an audience or introducing the last or next to last song of the night.

"Psychobilly Freakout" was covered by the musical organization WaveGroup Cover Studios for inclusion in Activision's Guitar Hero II video game. In contrast, the original master recording is featured on Guitar Hero Smash Hits.

Critical reception
Trouser Press called the album "fresh but mild," writing that the band "never really cut loose." MusicHound Rock: The Essential Album Guide wrote that the album "shows RHH before it grew out of its kitchy [sic] phase." The New Rolling Stone Album Guide called it "entirely derivative ... but it's also got plenty of verve and a touch of wit."

Track listing
"Bullet" – 3:06
"I'm Mad" – 3:16
"Bad Reputation" – 2:25
"It's a Dark Day" – 5:04
"Big Dwarf Rodeo" – 3:02
"Psychobilly Freakout" – 2:39
"Put It to Me Straight" – 2:34
"Marijuana" – 4:49
"Baby, You Know Who" – 2:39
"Eat Steak" – 2:33
"'D' for Dangerous" – 4:05
"Love Whip" – 3:43

Members and Included
Jim "Reverend Horton" Heath  - vocals, guitar
Jimbo Wallace - upright bass
Patrick "Taz" Bentley - drums
Tim Alexander (of Asleep at the Wheel) - piano (on "Love Whip")
Hook Herrerra (Hook and the Hitch-Hikers) - harmonica (on "Love Whip")
The Psychic Plowboy Horn Section (a.k.a., The Hooterville Horns) - horns (on "Love Whip")

References

1990 debut albums
The Reverend Horton Heat albums
Sub Pop albums